Slate Hill Settlement is an archaeological site in Northumberland, England, near the village of Bolam and about  west of Morpeth. The site, a defended settlement dating from the Iron Age, is a scheduled monument.

Description
The site is regarded as an example of a type of defended settlement of the Iron Age, first constructed in the 7th to 5th centuries BC in the northern uplands of what is now England, sometimes located on hilltops.  Within the enclosure there would be a number of stone or timber roundhouses for the inhabitants, probably a single family group, and perhaps space to keep livestock in winter.

On Slate Hill there are four concentric ramparts, terraced on the sloping hillside, in a semicircle forming on the north and west sides of an enclosure; quarrying has affected the east side where one rampart remains. On the south side a steep slope provides defence. A break in the west side is thought to be an original entrance.

Archaeological sites nearby
 Huckhoe Settlement, an Iron Age and Romano-British settlement
 The Poind and his Man, a Bronze Age burial mound
 Shaftoe Crags Settlement, a Romano-British defended settlement

References

Scheduled monuments in Northumberland
Archaeological sites in Northumberland
Belsay